Harry Joseph Boyle (October 7, 1915 in St. Augustine, Ontario - January 22, 2005 in Toronto, Ontario) was a Canadian broadcaster and writer.

He began his career in media working for a local radio station during the 1930s and later as district editor for the Stratford Beacon Herald. During this time he was also contributing articles to the London Free Press, Globe and Mail and the Toronto Telegram.

In 1942, he began working for the Canadian Broadcasting Corporation as its farm commentator as well as the director of the National Farm Radio Forum. In 1947, he launched CBC Wednesday Night, a three hour commercial-free block of music, opera, plays, and other high-brow entertainment.

In 1968, Boyle was appointed vice-chairman of the Canadian Radio-television and Telecommunications Commission (CRTC), and in August 1975 became its chairman. He held this position until 1977.

After leaving the CRTC, he became a member of faculty at the Banff School of Arts and a member of the Ontario Arts Council (1979–1982).

Boyle's writing was primarily autobiographical fiction dealing with life in rural southern Ontario during the interwar period. Two of his books were awarded the Stephen Leacock Medal for Humour: Homebrew and Patches in 1964 and Luck of the Irish in 1976.

In 1978, he was made an Officer of the Order of Canada. The same year he received an honorary doctorate from Concordia University.

Selected publications

The Inheritance: A Play in Three Acts (1949)
Mostly in Clover (1961)
Homebrew and Patches (1963) 
A Summer Burning (1964)
With a Pinch of Sin (1966) 
Straws in the Wind (1969) 
The Great Canadian Novel (1972) 
Memories of a Catholic Boyhood (1973) 
The Luck of the Irish (1975)

References

External links
Tribute by Pierre Juneau

York University: Harry J. Boyle fonds
Canadian Communications Foundation: Harry J. Boyle biography
Harry J. Boyle
Concordia University Honorary Degree Citation, June 1978, Concordia University Records Management and Archives

1915 births
2005 deaths
Canadian radio personalities
Chairpersons of the Canadian Radio-television and Telecommunications Commission
Officers of the Order of Canada
Stephen Leacock Award winners